Kiri Louise Pritchard-McLean (born 1986) is a Welsh comedian and writer. She has performed for several consecutive years at the Edinburgh Festival Fringe and won five Chortle Awards.

Career
Pritchard-McLean is the director and writer for sketch group Gein's Family Giftshop who were nominated for Best Newcomer in 2014 for the Edinburgh Comedy Award. As a sketch group they were also nominated for Chortle Awards in 2015. She took her debut show Hysterical Woman to the Edinburgh Festival Fringe in 2016. It transferred to the Soho Theatre for a run in June 2017. Her 2017 Edinburgh Fringe show was called Appropriate Adult and 2018's show was called Victim, Complex. Both shows were critically acclaimed and also transferred to Soho Theatre the following year.

Pritchard-McLean has appeared on Have I Got News for You, Russell Howard's Stand Up Central on Comedy Central and ITV's Elevenish,  Hypothetical, and Channel 4's 8 Out of 10 Cats Does Countdown as well as multiple appearances on the BBC Radio 4 shows The Now Show, The News Quiz and Elis James' State of the Nation. She is also co-host of the podcast All Killa No Filla along with fellow comedian Rachel Fairburn. In 2019 Pritchard-McLean became the host of the BBC Radio 4 Extra satirical sketch show Newsjack. In September 2019, she presented an edition of The News Quiz. In January 2020, she appeared as a panellist on Would I Lie to You? alongside David Mitchell and Jo Brand.

Her radio comedy pilot The Learners, a sitcom set in a Welsh-for-beginners class, premiered on 4 January 2021 on BBC Radio Wales. Written by Pritchard-McLean, it stars Tudur Owen, Janice Connolly, Mick Ferry, Kath Hughes, Oliver Pearce, Lisa Zahraand and Les Dennis. Her half-hour radio stand-up show Kiri Pritchard-McLean: Egg-sistential Crisis was released on BBC Radio 4 on 10 January 2020.

From June to August 2020, Pritchard-McLean presented a two-hour radio show on Saturday afternoons on BBC Radio Wales. She returned to the station in January 2021 to host a weekly Sunday afternoon show.

Kiri now also presents "Kiri's TV Flashback" on BBC One Wales.

Comedy awards
Pritchard-McLean won Best Compere and Best Club Comedian at the Chortle Awards in 2018,
Best Compere and Breakthrough Act at the Chortle Awards in 2019, 
and Best Compere at the Chortle Awards in 2020. 
She was awarded the Caroline Aherne Bursary in 2020. The bursary, which was launched in memory of comedy star Caroline Aherne, is aimed at new writer/performers from the North of England and awards £5,000 to the successful applicant to enable them to receive support from the BBC. Kiri will also receive mentorship from a BBC Comedy Commissioning Editor to develop a comedy script.

Personal life 
Born in Gloucester, she was raised on a farm in Llanbedrgoch on the island of Anglesey, Wales.

Pritchard-McLean was previously in a relationship with comedian James Meehan from sketch group Gein's Family Gift Shop. They split up in 2017 with both using their experience of the break-up to create Edinburgh Fringe shows in 2018. Pritchard-McLean's show focused on the accusation that Meehan gaslit her during the relationship.

References

External links
Official Website
Kiri Pritchard-McLean (BBC Radio Wales)
Best Medicine (BBC Radio 4)

Living people
BBC Radio Wales presenters
British women comedians
Welsh women comedians
Welsh comedy writers
Welsh stand-up comedians
British stand-up comedians
British women podcasters
British podcasters
People from Anglesey
1986 births